Ear to the Street is the debut studio album by American hip hop duo The Conscious Daughters. It was released in 1993 via Scarface Records and Priority Records. Production was handled solely by San Francisco rapper Paris. The album peaked at #126 on the Billboard 200, at #25 on the Top R&B/Hip-Hop Albums chart, and at #7 on the Heatseekers Albums. It spawned two singles, "Somethin' to Ride To (Fonky Expedition)" and "We Roll Deep," both of which made it to the Billboard charts.

Production
The album was produced by Paris, who also wrote the tracks and contributed instrumentation.  It was engineered by Eric Valentine.  The album came out two years after the duo had given Paris their demo tape.

Critical reception
Trouser Press deemed the album a "busy-beat debut," calling the group "a young Oakland tag team possessing average skills, big attitudes and no pretense of political awareness." The East Bay Express wrote that the album's two singles "are recognized as classics in the hip-hop canon." Complex listed "Fonky Expedition" at #46 on its list of "The 50 Greatest Bay Area Rap Songs."

Track listing

Personnel
Carla "CMG" Green – vocals
Karryl "Special One" Smith – vocals
DJ Yon – scratches
Oscar Jerome Jackson, Jr. – producer
Eric Dodd – engineering
Todd D. Smith – design
Victor Hall – photography

Charts

References

External links

1993 debut albums
The Conscious Daughters albums
Priority Records albums